The Foreigners Act, 1946 is an Act of the Imperial Legislative Assembly enacted to grant the certain powers to the Interim Government of India in matters of foreigners in India. The Act was enacted before India became independent.

Provisions
The Act defines a foreigner as "a person who is not a citizen of India". Section 9 of the Act states that, where the nationality of a person is not evident as per preceding section 8, the onus of proving whether a person is a foreigner or not, shall lie upon such person. According to the Foreigners (Report to the police) Order, 2001, made under the Foreigners Act 1946, where any person who has reason to believe that a foreigner has entered India without valid documents or is staying in India beyond the authorized period of stay accommodates such a foreigner in a premises occupied, owned or controlled by him, for whatever purpose, it shall be the duty of such a person to inform the nearest police station, within 24 hours, of the presence of such foreigner.

The Foreigners Act empowers the Indian government to detain a person until deportation back to their country of origin.

See also
 Illegal immigration to India
 Citizenship (Amendment) Act, 2019
 Indian nationality law
 National Register of Citizens of India
 Illegal Migrants (Determination by Tribunal) Act, 1983
 Illegal immigration to India

References 

Acts of the Imperial Legislative Council
1946 in law
Expatriates in India
1946 in India
Foreign relations of India
Indian nationality law
Legislation in British India